Daniel Baker College was founded April 5, 1889 in Brownwood, Texas, United States. It was named in memory of the Rev. Dr. Daniel Baker, a Presbyterian circuit-riding minister, who helped organize the first presbytery in Texas in 1840 and Austin College in 1849.

History
Daniel Baker College was founded by Dr. B. T. McClelland, fulfilling the plans of the Austin Presbytery to open a Presbyterian college for west Texas. Dr. McClelland, a Presbyterian minister and a graduate of Oberlin College and Union Theological Seminary in the City of New York, founded the first Presbyterian church in Brownwood in 1886. As the first president of Daniel Baker College, Dr. McClelland almost singlehandedly kept the college open during its early years, through his own personal determination.

The college's mascot was a goat named Hillbilly, which complemented their nickname, and its motto was Veritas et Humanitas, meaning "Truth and Humanity."

The institution was plagued with financial difficulties and was consolidated with nearby Howard Payne College (now Howard Payne University) in 1952.  Its campus was taken over by Howard Payne University and the main building was renovated as the Guy D. Newman Honors Academy.

Notable alumni
 Phil Baxter, songwriter, singer and band leader
 Frank Coker, American football player
 Novalyne Price Ellis, school teacher and speechwriter whose memoir was adapted into a movie
 Umphrey Lee, president of Southern Methodist University

References

 
Educational institutions established in 1889
1953 disestablishments in Texas
Buildings and structures in Brown County, Texas
Defunct private universities and colleges in Texas
Educational institutions disestablished in 1953
1889 establishments in Texas